The Searchers were an English Merseybeat group who emerged during the British Invasion of the 1960s. The band's hits include a remake of the Drifters' 1961 hit, "Sweets for My Sweet"; "Sugar and Spice" (written by their producer Tony Hatch); remakes of Jackie DeShannon's "Needles and Pins" and "When You Walk in the Room"; a cover of the Orlons' "Don't Throw Your Love Away"; and a cover of the Clovers' "Love Potion No. 9". With the Swinging Blue Jeans, the Searchers tied for being the second group from Liverpool, after the Beatles, to have a hit in the US when their "Needles and Pins" and the Swinging Blue Jeans' "Hippy Hippy Shake" both reached the Hot 100 on 7 March 1964.

Band history

Origins
Founded as a skiffle group in Liverpool in 1959 by John McNally and Mike Pender, the band took their name from the 1956 John Ford western film The Searchers.

The band grew out of an earlier skiffle group formed by McNally in 1957, with his friends Brian Dolan (guitar) and Tony West (bass – born Anthony West, in 1938, Waterloo, Liverpool, Lancashire – died 11 November 2010, West Way, Hightown, Merseyside). When the other two members lost interest, McNally was joined by his guitarist neighbour Mike Prendergast. They soon recruited Tony Jackson (born Anthony Paul Jackson, 16 July 1938, The Dingle, Liverpool, Lancashire – died 18 August 2003, Nottingham, Nottinghamshire) with his homemade bass guitar and amplifier, who was recruited as a lead singer, but took a back seat at first in order to learn the bass. The band styled themselves as "Tony and the Searchers" with Joe Kennedy on drums. Kennedy soon left to be replaced by Norman McGarry (born 1 March 1942, Liverpool, Lancashire), and it is this line-up – McNally, Pender (as Prendergast soon became known), Jackson and McGarry – that is usually cited as the original foursome.

1960s and 1970s

McGarry was forced to quit the band when he was put on the nightshift at the bakery where he worked and in 1960 his place was taken by Chris Crummey (26 August 1941 – 28 February 2005), who later changed his name to Chris Curtis.  Billy Beck, who changed his name to Johnny Sandon (born William Beck, 27 May 1941, Liverpool – died 23 December 1996) became the lead singer. The band had regular bookings at Liverpool's Iron Door Club as "Johnny Sandon and The Searchers".

Sandon left the band in late 1961 to join The Remo Four in February 1962. The group settled into a quartet named "The Searchers", with Jackson becoming the main vocalist. They continued to play at the Iron Door, The Cavern, and other Liverpool clubs. Like many similar acts they would do as many as three shows at different venues in one night. They negotiated a contract with the Star-Club in the St. Pauli district Hamburg for 128 days, with three one-hour performances a night, starting in July 1962.

The band returned to a residency at the Iron Door Club and it was there that they tape-recorded the sessions that led to a Pye Records recording contract with Tony Hatch as producer. The first single, "Sweets for My Sweet", featuring Tony Jackson as main vocalist supported by Pender and Curtis, shot to number one in the UK in 1963, firmly establishing the band as a major spearhead of the "Merseybeat" boom, just behind The Beatles and alongside Gerry and the Pacemakers.  Their first album, Meet The Searchers, sung mostly by Jackson and Pender, was released in August 1963 and reached number 2 on the British album charts the next month. With a slightly changed track listing, including the song "Needles and Pins", it hit #22 in the US album charts in June 1964.

In the US their first single was issued on Mercury and the second on Liberty, both without success; then a deal was arranged with US-based Kapp Records to distribute their records in America.

Philips Records then released an earlier recording they held of a cover of Brenda Lee's hit 'Sweet Nuthins', which dismayed the group. It made the lower end of the UK chart, but did not disturb their momentum.

In the 1964 film Saturday Night Out the group played the title song of the soundtrack.

Hatch played piano on some recordings and wrote "Sugar and Spice", the band's UK #2 hit record, under the pseudonym Fred Nightingale, a secret he kept from the band at the time. Apparently Curtis disliked this song (largely a revamp of the key aspects of first hits) and refused to sing on it. Jackson again took lead vocal, though Curtis later agreed to sing the distinctive high-harmony vocal links between verses. "Love Potion No.9", sung by Jackson, was a non-UK single lifted from the first LP that was a hit in the US on Kapp Records in 1965.

Mike Pender took the main lead vocal on the next two singles, both of which topped the UK charts: "Needles And Pins" and "Don't Throw Your Love Away", each featuring Chris Curtis on co-lead/high-harmony vocal. However, live footage of these songs, as performed on The Ed Sullivan Show and NME Poll Winners concert respectively, show Pender and Jackson singing the lead vocal together in close harmony, with vocal support from Curtis. That suggests some differences existed between the live band and the studio version at that time.

After scoring with their hit "Needles And Pins", bassist Tony Jackson, who was only allowed one co-lead vocal on their third album (on "Sho Know A Lot About Love"), left the band and was replaced by a Searchers' Hamburg pal, Frank Allen (born Francis Renaud McNeice, 14 December 1943, Hayes, London) from Cliff Bennett and The Rebel Rousers. Jackson was then signed to Pye as a solo act and, backed by The Vibrations, issued a few singles of which the first, "Bye Bye Baby", charted in the UK in 1964. He also re-cut "Love Potion No. 9" but it failed to chart. The next Searchers single to chart in the UK during this period was "Some Day We're Gonna Love Again" (1964).

Frank Allen's debut single with the band, a strong cover of Jackie DeShannon's "When You Walk in the Room", shot to #3 in the UK, suggesting all was well for the revised lineup (some fans had been unhappy about Jackson's shock departure), and later UK chart hits followed with "What Have They Done to the Rain", "Goodbye My Love" (a rather experimental single for that time, with long harmonised passages, that reached number four), then the folk-flavoured "Take Me For What I'm Worth" (written by P.F. Sloan). Some lesser UK chart hits followed in 1965 and 1966, with "He's Got No Love", "When I Get Home", and finally "Have You Ever Loved Somebody". An EP release, "Ain't Gonna Kiss Ya", featuring The Searchers' first LP track, "Ain't Gonna Kiss Ya" (sung by Jackson), also charted in 1963.

Pye rather "rush-released" LP product by the group in 1963 and 1964, as the cobbled-together Sugar and Spice LP was quickly issued in 1963, consisting of tracks not used on the first album and others, plus the second single. This album charted while the first was still in the charts, possibly diluting sales. Further Pye albums It's the Searchers (1964), Sounds Like Searchers and finally Take Me for What I'm Worth (both 1965) were better spaced, but a budget "Golden Guinea" reissue of the second album, plus a compilation Smash Hits and Smash Hits Vol 2, on Pye's budget "Marble Arch" label were issued during 1966 and 1967 in place of any later "new" album. As late as 1970, Marble Arch issued an edited version of It's the Searchers, the group's third album, originally released in 1964.

Chris Curtis, who had songwriting ambitions, left the band in April 1966 and was replaced by the Keith Moon-influenced John Blunt (born John David Blunt, 20 March 1947 in Croydon, London). In January 1970 he was replaced by Billy Adamson (born William Adamson on 27 May 1944 in Glasgow, Strathclyde, Scotland; died on 11 November 2013 in France). In 1967, Curtis formed a new band called Roundabout with keyboard player Jon Lord and guitarist Ritchie Blackmore. Curtis's involvement in the project was short-lived; Roundabout evolved into Deep Purple the following year.

Chris Curtis's choice of Bobby Darin's "When I Get Home", despite a strong band performance, was a relative chart failure by their standards. This to an extent undermined Curtis's position as song selector for the band, and some internal disagreements resurfaced over musical policy and direction that had been evident earlier when Tony Jackson had left, and likely played a part in Curtis leaving as well after the 1966 Australian tour. This departure was a major blow, as Curtis had been chief songwriter, song selector, and key high harmony voice, as well as a figurehead member and the main PR man.

As musical styles evolved, The Searchers did attempt to move with the times, recording covers of songs by The Rolling Stones ("Take It Or Leave it") and The Hollies "Have You Ever Loved Somebody", which was a minor UK chart hit though a rival cover by Paul & Barry Ryan probably robbed both parties of a bigger hit). They began to write their singles' A-sides, first with the Curtis-Pender track "He's Got No Love", which had a Stones-style guitar hook, and later a Pender-Allen song, "Secondhand Dealer", the final Pye single, which was a Ray Davies-style "observational" song. However, Pye records dropped the group in 1967 when their original contract expired. Without any follow-up to the strong 1965 album, Take Me For What I'm Worth, and despite some strong later recordings, no further chart successes occurred, doubling the impact of Chris Curtis's departure.

After Curtis' departure Frank Allen handled the high harmonies, and new drummer John Blunt boosted them musically but, despite some promising latter Pye singles, including a cover of "Western Union", their UK chart days were over. Although they continued to record for Liberty Records and RCA Records, they ended up on the British "Chicken-in-a-Basket" touring circuit, although they did score a minor US hit in 1971 with "Desdemona". A contract with RCA Victor's UK wing resulted in an album of rerecorded hits titled Second Take (1972), later reissued on the budget RCA International label as  Needles & Pins. However, that was overshadowed by Pye's "Golden Hour of..." compilation of the original hits that came out at the same time. Despite recording new material, including covers of Neil Sedaka's "Solitaire" and the Bee Gees' "Spicks And Specks", which were issued as RCA singles with scant promotion, much of their new work was not issued at the time, and RCA later dropped the group.

The group continued to tour through the 1970s, playing both the expected old hits as well as contemporary songs such as a powering extended live version of Neil Young's "Southern Man". They were rewarded in 1979 when Sire Records signed them to a multi-record deal. Two albums were released: The Searchers and Play for Today (retitled Love's Melodies outside the UK).  Both records garnered critical acclaim and featured some original tracks, as well as covers of songs such as Alex Chilton's "September Gurls" and John Fogerty's "Almost Saturday Night". But with scant promotion and little if any radio airplay, they did not break into the charts. The first album was quickly revamped following release with a few extra tracks added, one song dropped (a cover of Bob Dylan's "Coming From The Heart"), and a new sleeve, which may have only confused the public.

The albums did, however, revive the group's career, because concerts from then on alternated classic hits with the newer songs that were well received. A Sire single, "Hearts in Her Eyes", written by Will Birch and John Wicks of The Records, and successfully updating their distinctive 12-string guitars/vocal harmonies sound, picked up some radio airplay, and with more promotion might have charted. Meanwhile, PRT Records actively promoted the group's sixties back catalogue, with compilations such as "The Searchers File" and "Spotlight on the Searchers", which were on sale at group gigs, along with the Sire albums, and helped re-establish them.

According to John McNally, the band was ready to head into the studio to record a third album for Sire when they were informed that, due to label reorganisation, their contract had been dropped.

1980s – 2020s
In 1981, the band signed to PRT Records (formerly Pye, their original label) and began recording an album.  But only one single, "I Don't Want To Be The One" backed with "Hollywood", ended up being released. They promoted this with a UK Television appearance on "The Leo Sayer Show", which was rare for them by then, but the single got little if any radio airplay (like their Sire singles) and was not stocked by most record shops. The rest of the tracks, except one, would be included as part of 1992's 30th Anniversary collection.

After a farewell performance in London in December 1985 Mike Pender left the group to form a new band and now tours as Mike Pender's Searchers (originally a permanent band but now made up of musicians hired as necessary), performing Searchers' songs and some new material of his own. McNally and Allan, following Pender's departure, recruited former First Class vocalist Spencer James as his replacement.

In 1988, Coconut Records signed the Searchers and the album Hungry Hearts was the result. It featured updated remakes of "Needles and Pins" and "Sweets for My Sweet" plus live favorite "Somebody Told Me You Were Crying". While the album was not a major hit, it did keep the group in the public eye.

The band continued to tour, with Eddie Rothe replacing Adamson on drums, and during that period was considered to be one of the most popular 1960s bands on the UK concert circuit. In turn, in 2010 Eddie Rothe left The Searchers after becoming engaged to singer Jane McDonald, and was replaced on 26 February by Scott Ottaway.

Billy Adamson, the band's drummer from 1970 to 1998, died in France on 11 November 2013, aged 69.

In September 2017, John McNally had a stroke and stood aside from the band for two months to recover.

In 2018, The Searchers announced that the band would be retiring, and they ended their farewell tour on 31 March 2019. They did not rule out the possibility of a reunion tour, and it was announced on the band's website in 2021 that they would undertake a further farewell tour in 2023, this time with unknown drummer Richard Burns

Discography

The Searchers have a core catalogue consisting of nine studio albums.

Studio Albums
 1963 – Meet The Searchers
 1963 – Sugar and Spice
 1964 – It's the Searchers
 1965 – Sounds Like Searchers 
 1965 – Take Me for What I'm Worth
 1972 – Second Take 
 1979 – Searchers
 1981 – Play for Today
 1988 – Hungry Hearts

Members

Timeline

References

Further reading

McCormack, Peter. "The Searchers History", Needles & Pins (2005). Retrieved 18 June 2005
 Fabgear, "Tommy Quickly & The Remo Four", The British Beat Boom
 Mike Pratt co-writer of "The System"

External links

Mike Pender's Searchers official site

Articles about The Searchers by Roy Clough
The Searchers discography

Musical groups established in 1959
English pop music groups
Musical groups from Liverpool
Pye Records artists
Beat groups
British Invasion artists
Liberty Records artists
Mercury Records artists
RCA Victor artists
Sire Records artists
Philips Records artists
Kapp Records artists
Musical groups disestablished in 2019
1959 establishments in England